Wen-Yi Wendy Lou is a biostatistician who works as a professor in the Dalla Lana School of Public Health of the University of Toronto. Her research interests include the theory of runs and patterns in sequence data and applications of statistics to health care.

Education and career
Lou completed her Ph.D. in biostatistics in 1995 at the University of Toronto. Her dissertation was On runs tests for independence of binary longitudinal data using the method of finite Markov chain imbedding.  She worked as a faculty member in the Mount Sinai School of Medicine, at that time affiliated with New York University, before moving back to Toronto.

Book
With James C. Fu, Lou is the author of the book Distribution Theory of Runs and Patterns and Its Applications: A Finite Markov Chain Imbedding Approach (World Scientific, 2003).

Recognition
Lou is the former holder of the Canada Research Chair in Statistical Methods for Health Care in the Dalla Lana School.

In 2013 Lou became a Fellow of the American Statistical Association "for her notable contributions to the distribution theory of runs and patterns, for remarkable collaborations in the biomedical and healthcare sciences, for exemplary leadership in statistical education and outstanding service to the profession".

References

Year of birth missing (living people)
Living people
Canadian statisticians
Women statisticians
Biostatisticians
University of Toronto alumni
Icahn School of Medicine at Mount Sinai faculty
Academic staff of the University of Toronto
Fellows of the American Statistical Association
Canada Research Chairs
Presidents of the Statistical Society of Canada